Puteri Indonesia 2023, the 26th Puteri Indonesia pageant, will be held in 2023. Puteri Indonesia 2022, Laksmi Shari De-Neefe Suardana of Bali will crown her successor at the end of the event. From this edition, Puteri Indonesia lost the rights to select and send the Indonesian representative to the Miss Universe competition. Puteri Indonesia 2023 will represent Indonesia at Miss International 2023. Puteri Indonesia Lingkungan 2022 and Puteri Indonesia Pariwisata 2022, Cindy May McGuire of Jakarta SCR 5 and Adinda Cresheilla of East Java will also crown their successors. Puteri Indonesia Pariwisata 2023 will represent Indonesia at Miss Supranational 2023 and Puteri Indonesia Lingkungan 2023 will represent Indonesia at Miss Charm 2024.

Background

Selection of participants 

10 contestants were chosen from the regional competition held in their respective provinces. They were South Sumatra, Lampung, Banten, East Java, Bali, West Nusa Tenggara, East Kalimantan, South Sulawesi, Central Sulawesi, and North Sulawesi. 29 contestants were selected by judges through an audition held in Jakarta, four by audiences through public voting, and two from alumni wildcard. In total, 45 contestants competed for the title, making it the biggest turnout for Puteri Indonesia to date.

Contestants 
39 from 45 delegates was selected.

Notes

References 

Puteri Indonesia
2023 in Indonesia
Beauty pageants in Indonesia